Substitution may refer to:

Arts and media
Chord substitution, in music, swapping one chord for a related one within a chord progression
Substitution (poetry), a variation in poetic scansion
"Substitution" (song), a 2009 song by Silversun Pickups
Substitution (theatre), an acting methodology
Tritone substitution, in music, reinterpreting a chord via a new root note located an augmented fourth or diminished fifth distant from the root of the original interpretation

Science and mathematics

Biology and chemistry
Base-pair substitution or point mutation, a type of mutation
Substitution reaction, where a functional group in a chemical compound is replaced by another group
Substitution, a process in which an allele arises and undergoes fixation

Mathematics and computing
Substitution (algebra), replacing occurrences of some symbol by a given value
Substitution (logic), a syntactic transformation on strings of symbols of a formal language
String substitution, a mapping of letters in an alphabet to languages
Substitution cipher, a method of encryption
Integration by substitution, a method for finding antiderivatives and integrals

Other uses in science
Substitution (economics), switching between alternative consumable goods as their relative prices change
Attribute substitution, a psychological process thought to underlie a number of cognitive biases and perceptual illusions
Substitution method, a method of measuring the transmission loss of an optical fiber

Other uses
Substitution (law), the replacement of a judge
Substitution (sport), where a sports team is able to change one player for another during a match

Within Wikipedia
Help:Substitution, help performing substitution on Wikipedia pages
Special:ExpandTemplates, page that shows what will result from substitution
Wikipedia:Substitution, where, when, how, and what about using substitution on Wikipedia

See also
Import substitution industrialization, a trade and economic policy
Penal substitution, a theory of the atonement within Christian theology
Simultaneous substitution, a practice requiring Canadian television distribution companies to substitute a non-local station signal with the local signal
Substituent, an atom or group of atoms
Substitute (disambiguation)
Substitution therapy or opiate replacement therapy